Jyoti Dhawale (also known as "Jo") is a global ambassador and HIV activist who has been dedicated to empowering people living with HIV/AIDS across India and the world.

Early life
Jyoti was born July 24, 1976 in India at Namkum Military Hospital in Ranchi, Jharkhand. Her father, Captain Janak Narayan Dhawale, was an officer in the Indian Air Force and her mother was a homemaker. Dhawale grew up and was schooled in various parts of India. She finished her secondary schooling from National Institute of Open Schooling, New Delhi.

Childhood tragedy
She suffered from hearing loss at the age of 3 years due to a vehicular accident that took place in Pahalgam. Dhawale strongly relies on lip-reading to follow the conversations and uses text messaging or video calls, instead of phone calls.

Medical negligence
Dhawale was detected HIV positive in 2005 due to medical negligence when she was admitted to hospital to undergo a forced abortion by her ex-husband for the third time. On her fourth forced attempt, she tested positive, and decided to go ahead with the pregnancy. On March 31, 2006, she delivered a healthy, HIV negative baby born via Cesarean section.

Career

Humanitarian work
Dhawale is a supporter of the rights and equality of PLWHA, LGBT community and supports the LGBT movement in India. She has been involved in various activities concerning human rights, human trafficking, sex workers and women and child health since 2007.
Through the medium of the internet and personal meetings, she has counselled and guided many HIV (infected/affected) and suicide-related cases. She has supported Bapuji Center for AIDS Research & Education, (B'CARE) since 2012 as a regional coordinator for its Hyderabad-Mumbai AIDS Ride 2014.[1] She is also a motivational speaker at Deep Griha Society based in Pune.

Activism
Dhawale uses Facebook as a medium to promote awareness and education of People Living with HIV/AIDS (PLWHA) and is connected with other international activists as well as PLWHA survivors. In December 2012, she was part of a photography workshop in Mumbai and short documentary film by Through Positive Eyes, in collaboration with Heroes Project, along with 13 other HIV-positive people. She learned under the guidance of Roy Wadia, brother of Riyad Vinci Wadia who worked for World Health Organization.

Featured in publications
An interview with Dhawale was published in the Times of India stating an example of successful and satisfied life of a mixed-status couple. She regularly inspires, motivates and encourages people living with HIV to live a healthy lifestyle. Her interview articles have been published in various sites.
Dhawale's responsibility as The Stigma Project ambassador enables her to create and spread awareness, art, provocation and education on a wide scale.
In her documentary video about Life After HIV, for Through Positive Eyes, she speaks in brief about her journey. The project was co-directed by London-based South African photographer and AIDS activist Gideon Mendel.

Endorsements
Since 2012, Dhawale has been the Indian Goodwill ambassador of The Stigma Project, which provides insight into HIV stigma within countries/communities. The program enables her to create and spread awareness, art, provocation and education on wide scale.
Dhawale is also a face of RiseUpToHIV campaign with a tagline, "No Shame About Being HIV Positive." 
The campaign received the 2014-2015 KarmaVeer Award from iCongo REX for selfless work through social activism and reaching out to break the myth against HIV.

Personal life
Dhawale lives in Nagpur, Maharashtra. and has one child.

References

1976 births
Living people
People with HIV/AIDS
HIV/AIDS in India
HIV/AIDS activists
Social workers
Indian women activists
Indian LGBT rights activists
Indian motivational speakers
People from Ranchi district
Marathi people
Women civil rights activists